Michael Barber is an American rapper and musician. He was signed to both Universal Music Group and Death Row Records through WIDEawake Entertainment. Michael graduated from Full Sail University.

Early life
Michael Barber was born and raised in Evansville, Indiana. He attended Catholic schools and graduated from William Henry Harrison High School. Barber moved to Winter Park, Florida, and earned a bachelor's degree in entertainment business from the entertainment industry college Full Sail University.

Music career

In 2009 Michael Barber signed a distribution deal with Universal Music Group after the success of his mixtape series Motion Picture Mayhem. In 2009 Barber and Josh Tifer released a single titled, 'Take Your Time', with Interscope Digital.

Barber was featured on two releases by Death Row Records. Most notable was the single, Sofa Bed with Audio Stepchild featuring Nappy Roots which also featured 2 remixes. The first remix Another Sofa Bed was featured on the Nappy Roots mixtape, Sh*t's Beautiful. The second remix titled, Sofa Bed 502 Remix was featured on the compilation titled, The Hookah Lounge.

The success of Sofa Bed lead to Michael signing an album deal with Death Row Records. His album was never released as the company went into its second bankruptcy. This led to him being the last artist to ever sign with Death Row Records.

After a hiatus from making music, Michael Barber returned in 2016 with Indiana rapper Matty Moe for a duet album titled, Deadly Combo. Deadly Combo featured major artist features from Nappy Roots and the Wu Tang Clan official member, Streetlife.

In 2018 Michael's album AHAYWEH was released as for sale as a hard copy CD only via his website and in 200 libraries across the country.

In early 2019, Michael and the Indivisible movement released 4 remixes of his protest song, Ladder. Each version was composed in a different music genre, and each was named for a different protest against President Trump and his agenda. Writing in the Arlington Heights Post, community contributor Kathy Colace called the 4 remixes "powerful."

References 

Musicians from Evansville, Indiana
Living people
Rappers from Indiana
Midwest hip hop musicians
Songwriters from Indiana
21st-century American rappers
Year of birth missing (living people)